Palm Beach Gardens is a city in Palm Beach County in the U.S. state of Florida, 77 miles north of downtown Miami.  , the population was 59,182. Palm Beach Gardens is a principal city of the Miami metropolitan area, which was home to an estimated 6.1 million people at the 2019 census.

Geography

Climate

Palm Beach Gardens has a tropical rainforest climate (Af) with long, hot, and rainy summers and short, warm winters with mild nights.

History

Prior to development, the land that became Palm Beach Gardens was primarily cattle ranches and pine forests, as well as swampland farther west. In 1959, wealthy landowner and insurance magnate John D. MacArthur announced plans to develop  and build homes for 55,000 people. He chose the name Palm Beach Gardens after his initial choice, Palm Beach City, was denied by the Florida Legislature, because of the similarity of the name to the nearby Palm Beach. MacArthur planned to build a "garden city" so he altered the name slightly.  The city was incorporated as a "paper town" (meaning that it existed only on paper) in 1959. The 1960 Census recorded that the city officially had a population of one, apparently a squatter whom MacArthur had allowed to stay on his property.

Rapid development took place in the 1960s. By 1970 the city had a population approaching 7,000 people. To showcase his new community, MacArthur purchased an 80-year-old banyan tree located in nearby Lake Park, that was to be cut down to enlarge a dentist's office. It cost $30,000 and 1,008 hours of manpower to move it. A second banyan was moved the following year. While moving the first banyan tree over the Florida East Coast Railway, the massive tree shifted and disconnected the Western Union telephone and telegraph lines running adjacent to the railroad, cutting off most communications between Miami,  to the south, and the outside world until the damage could be repaired.  These trees still remain at the center of MacArthur Boulevard near Northlake Boulevard and are still featured on the city shield. In January 2007, the great-grandson of impressionist artist Pierre-Auguste Renoir, Alexandre Renoir, presented a painting to the city which depicts the Gardens banyan tree. It is currently on display at the city hall on North Military Trail.

City growth was slow but steady throughout the 1970s and 1980s, as the population has still not reached the predicted 55,000 people envisioned by MacArthur. Development of this property happened quickly and led to much new growth in the city. The city adopted an Art in Public Places ordinance in 1989 and has amassed an eclectic collection of works.

The city suffered much damage to its tropical landscaping in the hard freezes of 1985 and 1989, but has experienced no freezing temperatures since then. The city was hit by Hurricane Frances, Hurricane Jeanne, and Hurricane Wilma in 2004 and 2005. Much of the city lost power for days at a time after each storm, and many traffic signals and directional signs in the city were destroyed. Many homes and businesses were severely damaged during the first two storms and contractors and construction materials were at a premium. Hundreds of homes were only nearing final repair when Hurricane Wilma hit the following year damaging or destroying many of those completed or ongoing repairs.

The Gardens Mall, PGA Commons, Midtown, Legacy Place, and Downtown at the Gardens are the center of the city's retail market. They are located on the municipality's main stretch on PGA Boulevard.

Sport

There are 12 golf courses within the city limits, including a course owned by the municipality. The Professional Golfers' Association of America has its headquarters in the city.

The Honda Classic has been held at two Palm Beach Gardens locations: from 2003 to 2006 at the Country Club at Mirasol and since 2007 at the PGA National Resort and Spa. Also, the Senior PGA Championship was held at the current BallenIsles from 1964 to 1973, and at the PGA National Golf Club from 1982 to 2000. PGA National was also the site of the 1983 Ryder Cup and the 1987 PGA Championship.

In February 2018, the Palm Beach Gardens-based company FITTEAM concluded a 12-year deal with Major League Baseball′s Houston Astros and Washington Nationals giving it the naming rights to The Ballpark of the Palm Beaches – spring training home of the Astros and Nationals – in nearby West Palm Beach. The facility was renamed FITTEAM Ballpark of the Palm Beaches.

Economy

Top employers

According to Palm Beach Gardens' 2014 Comprehensive Annual Financial Report, the top employers in the city are:

Education

Public K-12 primary and secondary schools are administrated by the School District of Palm Beach County. Palm Beach Gardens Community High School and William T. Dwyer High School are the local public high schools. The Upper School campus of The Benjamin School is also located in Palm Beach Gardens.

The Edward M. Eissey Campus, a satellite campus of the Palm Beach State College, is located in Palm Beach Gardens. It includes the Eissey Theatre for the Performing Arts.

Demographics

2020 census

As of the 2020 United States census, there were 59,182 people, 24,191 households, and 14,907 families residing in the city.

2010 census

, there were 27,663 households, out of which 17.6% were vacant. As of 2000, 23.4% had children under the age of 18 living with them, 53.8% were married couples living together, 8.9% had a female householder with no husband present, and 34.5% were non-families. 27.7% of all households were made up of individuals, and 10.5% had someone living alone who was 65 years of age or older. The average household size was 2.23 and the average family size was 2.70.

2000 census

In 2000, the city's population was spread out, with 18.7% under the age of 18, 5.1% from 18 to 24, 26.3% from 25 to 44, 28.9% from 45 to 64, and 21.1% who were 65 years of age or older. The median age was 45 years. For every 100 females, there were 90.0 males. For every 100 females age 18 and over, there were 86.4 males.

In 2007, the median income for a household in the city was $69,630 and the median income for a family was $83,715.  In 2000, males had a median income of $50,045 versus $33,221 for females. In 2015, The per capita income for the city was $52,191. About 3.5% of families and 5.6% of the population were below the poverty line, including 6.9% of those under age 18 and 3.5% of those age 65 or over.

As of 2000, 89.27% of the population spoke only English at home; Spanish was spoken by 5.60% of the population, Italian by 1.00%, French by 0.83%, and German by 0.61%.  Eleven other languages were spoken in the city, each of which are reported at less than 0.5%.

Emergency Services

Law Enforcement

The Palm Beach Gardens Police Department has 127 sworn officers . Its operational divisions include Road Patrol, Traffic, K-9, Detective and Crime Scene Investigation, SWAT and Hostage Negotiation. The department also has an 85-member Volunteers in Police Service (VIPS) unit, including a Police Explorer Post.

As of 2022, the Chief of Police is Clinton Shannon. In 2016 a police officer was convicted for the killing of Corey Jones, an African American man awaiting a tow truck after his vehicle broke down in Palm Beach Gardens.

The Police Department provides protection to the city and also manages NorthComm - The North County Communications Center which handles emergency communications for the City of Palm Beach Gardens, the village's of Tequesta and North Palm Beach, and the town's of Jupiter, Juno Beach and Palm Beach Shores.  When someone calls 9-1-1 in one of these locations, their call is routed to NorthComm and from there they notify the nearest available police unit.

The Palm Beach Gardens Police Foundation is a non-profit foundation holding IRS 501(c)(3) status. The Mission of the Palm Beach Gardens Police Foundation is to secure private funding to enhance the integrity of the community and the effectiveness of the Police Department.  It does this by providing funding for innovative police department projects, that would not otherwise be funded from the city's budget.

Fire Rescue

The Palm Beach Gardens Fire Rescue Department has been serving the citizen's of the city since 1964. The department operates out of the following five stations located throughout the City: 

Station 61 - Battalion 61, EMS 61, Ladder 61, Rescue 61, Brush 564, Air/Light 61;
Station 62 - Engine 62, Rescue 62;
Station 63 - Engine 63, Rescue 63, Brush 563, Boat 63;
Station 64 - Engine 64, Rescue 64, Truck 64;
Station 65 - Engine 65, Rescue 65.  

On September 11, 2010, the city dedicated its "09.11.01 Memorial Plaza" at Fire Station 63 on Northlake Boulevard. The memorial commemorates the September 11, 2001 attacks. Its centerpiece is a steel section retrieved from the ruins of the World Trade Center in New York City.

Government

The city charter provides for a council-manager government. The city council consists of five Palm Beach Gardens residents elected to serve three-year terms. A quorum of three members may conduct city business. The city manager is appointed by a majority vote of the council.

Each year, the council appoints one of its members to be mayor, and another to be vice-mayor.

Transportation

In December 1987, the last "missing link" of Interstate 95 (I-95) opened between PGA Boulevard in Palm Beach Gardens and State Road 714, west of Stuart, paving the way for new development immediately to the north. There are three interchanges on I-95 serving the city and a fourth at Central Boulevard is under consideration. The city also is served by two interchanges on Florida's Turnpike.

Public transit is available to the rest of Palm Beach County through the regional commuter bus system PalmTran. In addition, the South Florida Regional Transportation Authority has proposed extending the Tri-Rail commuter rail system northward with a proposed station near PGA Boulevard north of the current terminus at Mangonia Park. A trolley system is also proposed to serve the newly developed "Downtown" area.

The nearest major airports, with driving distances measured from Palm Beach Gardens city hall, are:

The nearest general aviation airports are:

Notable people

Some notable Palm Beach Gardens residents, past and present, include:

 Paul Goldschmidt, baseball first baseman and 2022 National League MVP
 Sally Ann Howes, English Actress best known for her role as Truly Scrumptious in Chitty Chitty Bang Bang
 Dustin Johnson, professional golfer on the PGA Tour
 Anirban Lahiri, Indian professional golfer on the PGA Tour
 Thomas Levet, professional golfer on the PGA European Tour
 Stacy Lewis, professional golfer on the LPGA Tour
 Vincent Marotta, entrepreneur, co-developer of Mr. Coffee
 Charl Schwartzel, professional golfer on the PGA Tour
 Chris Volstad, Major League Baseball pitcher
 Lee Westwood, professional golfer on the PGA Tour 
 Serena Williams (born 1981), tennis professional
 Venus Williams, tennis professional

References

External links

 City of Palm Beach Gardens Official website

 
Cities in Florida
Cities in Palm Beach County, Florida
Populated places established in 1959
1959 establishments in Florida